Timothy J. Gilfoyle is an American historian from New York who is a professor of history at Loyola University Chicago, where he teaches American urban and social history.

He gained a B.A. in 1979, followed by a Ph.D. in history at Columbia University in 1987. He is the former president of the Urban History Association (2015–16).

His academic research is mainly concerned with the evolution of 19th-century underworld subcultures and informal economies.

Honors and awards
Gilfoyle is a Guggenheim Fellow (1998–99) and a senior fellow at the Smithsonian Institution's National Museum of American History (1997).

He is an elected fellow of the Society of American Historians (2011) and the American Antiquarian Society (2007).

Bibliography

The following are some of Gilfoyle's books:
 City of Eros: New York City, Prostitution, and the Commercialization of Sex, 1790-1920  (1992)
 A Pickpocket's Tale: The Underworld of Nineteenth-Century New York (2006)
 Millennium Park: Creating a Chicago Landmark (2006)
 The Flash Press: Sporting Male Weeklies in 1840s New York (co-authored, 2008)
 The Urban Underworld in Late Nineteenth-Century New York  (2013)

References

External links
 

Year of birth missing (living people)
Living people
21st-century American historians
American male non-fiction writers
Loyola University Chicago faculty
21st-century American male writers

Columbia College (New York) alumni
Columbia Graduate School of Arts and Sciences alumni